Michael Ware (born 1969) is an Australian journalist.

Michael Ware may also refer to:
 Mike Ware (photographer) (born 1939), English photographer known for work on alternative processes
 Mike Ware (ice hockey) (born 1967), Canadian ice hockey player